During the 1969–70 English football season, Everton F.C. competed in the Football League First Division. They won their 7th League title finishing ahead of Leeds United and Chelsea.

Final League Table

P = Matches played; W = Matches won; D = Matches drawn; L = Matches lost; F = Goals for; A = Goals against; GA = Goal average; GD = Goal difference; Pts = Points

Results

Football League First Division

League Cup

FA Cup

Squad

References

1969-70
Everton F.C. season
English football championship-winning seasons